Horizon (styled as HORIZON) is pop/rock group Remioromen's third full-length album, released on May 17, 2006. The disc contains 12 songs.

Track listing

The Music video is photographed at a runway of Japan Airlines Senior High School.
1-2 Love Forever

MONSTER

2006 albums
Remioromen albums
Albums produced by Takeshi Kobayashi